The 1925 New South Wales state election was for 90 seats representing 24 electoral districts, with each district returning between 3 and 5 members. This was the third and final election in New South Wales that took place under a modified Hare-Clark voting system. The average number of enrolled voters per member was 14,690, ranging from Sturt (10,297) to Ryde (19,119).

Results by electoral district

Balmain

Bathurst

Botany

Byron

Cootamundra

Cumberland

Eastern Suburbs

Goulburn

Maitland

Murray

Murrumbidgee

Namoi

Newcastle

North Shore

Northern Tableland

Oxley

Parramatta

Ryde

St George

Sturt

Sydney

Wammerawa

Western Suburbs

Wollondilly

See also 
 Candidates of the 1925 New South Wales state election
 Members of the New South Wales Legislative Assembly, 1925–1927

Notes

References 

1925